The Man on the Eiffel Tower is a 1950 American Ansco Color film noir mystery film directed by Burgess Meredith and starring Charles Laughton, Franchot Tone, Meredith, and Robert Hutton. It is based on the 1931 novel La Tête d'un homme (A Man's Head) by Belgian writer Georges Simenon featuring his detective Jules Maigret. The film was co-produced by Tone and Irving Allen as A&T Film Productions and released by RKO Radio Pictures. Much of the outdoor action occurs in various familiar Paris locales.

The film is also known as L'homme de la tour Eiffel in France.

Plot

In the streets of Paris a myopic knife grinder Heurtin (Burgess Meredith) is berated by his partner for his lack of money. As she storms away, she bumps into Kirby (Robert Hutton), an unemployed playboy who is having an affair. As he enters a restaurant to meet his wife (Patricia Roc), Kirby is warned by the waiter that both wife and his mistress are waiting for him at the bar. The nature of the relationship becomes obvious to the wife, who leaves the pair, but not before teasing the mistress Edna (Jean Wallace) that Kirby will have no money until his aunt dies. Kirby reads a note that has been left at his feet, that his predicament has been overheard, and he can be helped for a million francs. He understands the note, signed by "MV", is an invitation to murder. As Edna leaves, in a moment prefiguring the novel The Dice Man, Kirby says he had a question and if he throws two aces with poker dice he'll say yes. All five come up aces.

At night, in the house of the aunt, the knife grinder finds a woman dead, and in a panic he falls over, losing his makeshift eyeglasses. The figure of a man appears, his feet and hands bound so as not to leave prints. He steps on the glasses, and Heurtin leaves the house in terror. Outside his accomplice reassures him and promises to protect him if he lays low.

The newspapers say that both the aunt and her maid were murdered. Inspector Maigret (Charles Laughton) takes the case, and finding the broken glasses soon arrests Heurtin. In prison, Heurtin's partner apologises to him for her nagging, which she realises drove him to crime. Maigret suspects that Heurtin was guilty of burglary only but won't talk, so he arranges a bogus prison escape so he can be followed. Unfortunately for Maigret, the scheme backfires, and Heurtin becomes lost. At a bar where he finds the Kirby trio, Maigret spots Heurtin, who is clearly looking for his accomplice. When a patron of the restaurant refuses to pay his bill and police are called, Maigret suspects this is a ruse to frighten away Heurtin. Further investigation reveals that the diner, Radek (Franchot Tone), is a brilliant and educated young man who is also bipolar. A cat and mouse game follows in which Radek taunts Maigret. In the process, Kirby shoots himself after being chased by Maigret in his aunt's house, but before dying he gives up the letters MV. Redek then tries to implicate Mrs Kirby and Edna in the murders.

Eventually, owing to a clever ruse by Maigret, Radek is exposed and, after a car chase, dashes up the Eiffel Tower, pursued by an angry Heurtin, whom Radek dodges. Radek is clearly keen to die spectacularly, but his low mood takes over and he is arrested. Maigret meets Radek one last time at the guillotine, but declines to watch. In the street outside Maigret watches the sight of Parisian lovers enjoying themselves, and spots Heurtin with his partner. Heurtin is now wearing proper spectacles. Maigret in happy mood returns to police headquarters.

Cast 
 Charles Laughton as Inspector Jules Maigret
 Franchot Tone as Johann Radek
 Burgess Meredith as Joseph Heurtin
 Robert Hutton as Bill Kirby
 Jean Wallace as Edna Wallace
 Patricia Roc as Helen Kirby
 Belita as Gisella Heurtin
 George Thorpe as Comelieu
 William Phipps as Janvier
 William Cottrell as Moers
 Chaz Chase as Waiter
 Wilfrid Hyde-White as Professor Grollet

References

External links 
 
 
 
 
 

1950 films
American mystery films
1950s French-language films
Maigret films
American police detective films
Films directed by Charles Laughton
Films directed by Burgess Meredith
Films directed by Irving Allen
Films scored by Michel Michelet
1950s crime thriller films
Films with screenplays by Harry Brown (writer)
French black-and-white films
English-language French films
1950s police procedural films
RKO Pictures films
1950 directorial debut films
American black-and-white films
Eiffel Tower in fiction
1950s American films